Alphonse Calhoun Avery House, also known as the Avery-Surnrnersette House, is a historic home located at Morganton, Burke County, North Carolina.  It was built about 1876, and is a two-story, U-shaped, Late Victorian style brick house.  It features 2-l/2-story, squarish, brick tower topped by a mansard roof.

Alphonso Calhoun Avery was born at Swan Ponds in 1835, the fifth son of Isaac Thomas Avery (1785-1864). Avery had a notable legal, military and political careers highlighted by an eight-year term as an associate justice of the North Carolina Supreme Court.

It was listed on the National Register of Historic Places in 1984. It is located in the North Green Street-Bouchelle Street Historic District.

References

Houses on the National Register of Historic Places in North Carolina
Victorian architecture in North Carolina
Houses completed in 1876
Houses in Burke County, North Carolina
National Register of Historic Places in Burke County, North Carolina
Historic district contributing properties in North Carolina